Artak Dashyan (born on 20 November 1989 in Yerevan, Armenia) is an Armenian professional footballer who plays as a midfielder for Pyunik and the Armenia national team.

Club career
Artak Dashyan is a graduate of the football school Shengavit. In 2006, he received an invitation from Banants Yerevan, for which he began performing for in the Armenian Premier League in 2007. Dashyan's potential began to show at an early age. His game drew the attention of the head coach of the club, and then the football team.

In the 2009 Armenian Premier League, during a 24-round game between Banants and Shirak Gyumri, he insulted the referee and was immediately sent off. The Football Federation of Armenia Disciplinary Committee decided to disqualify the player for the next four matches of the Armenian Premier League and his club was fined $150 000 AMD.

After meeting in Metalurh Donetsk, coached by former Banants head coach Nikolay Kostov, Dashyan had signed a contract for 3 years with the possibility of renewal in another 2.

Dashyan rarely got into matches and left the touch-lines only as a replacement player. Metalurh decided to put the player on loan. The main stakeholder in getting the player was former club Banants. As a result, the leaders of the two clubs reached an agreement on the transition of Dashyan on lease conditions to Banants. Dashyan effortlessly merged with the plans of the coaching team. After the retirement of team captain Arthur Voskanyan in mid-season, the new team captain became Arsen Balabekyan and Dashyan became vice-captain. After the conclusion of the season, the club decided not to renew the contract with Balabekyan, who left the club. Dashyan thus became the team captain. In 2013, he was transferred to Gandzasar Kapan.

In January 2014, Dashyan joined Al-Muharraq on loan for the remainder of the 2013–14 season.

In 2016, he was transferred to FC Alashkert.

On 6 March 2020, FC Atyrau announced the signing of Dashyan.

On 16 December 2021, FC Pyunik announced the signing of Dashyan.

International career
Dashyan joined the Armenia U-21 youth team in 2008. A year later, he became a member of the Armenia national football team. His first match with the national team was held on 11 February 2009 in Cyprus in a friendly match against Latvia. The match ended 0–0. Dashyan subsequently played in a FIFA World Cup qualification match against Spain on 10 October 2009 and a friendly match against Iran on 11 August 2010 (1–3 Loss).

International goals

Personal life
He got married in late November 2011.

Club career stats

Honours

Club
Pyunik
Armenian Premier League: 2021–22

Banants Yerevan
Armenian Premier League Runner-up (1): 2007
Armenian Cup (1): 2007
Armenian Cup Runner-up (1): 2008, 2009
Armenian Supercup Runner-up (1): 2011-12

Shakhtar Donetsk
Ukrainian Cup Runner-up (1): 2009–10

References

External links

Profile at FFA.am

armfootball.tripod.com

1989 births
Living people
Footballers from Yerevan
Armenian footballers
Armenia international footballers
Armenian expatriate footballers
Association football midfielders
FC Metalurh Donetsk players
FK Vardar players
FC Alashkert players
FC Gandzasar Kapan players
FC Urartu players
Al-Muharraq SC players
FC Atyrau players
Ukrainian Premier League players
Armenian Premier League players
Macedonian First Football League players
Kazakhstan Premier League players
Expatriate footballers in Ukraine
Expatriate footballers in Bahrain
Expatriate footballers in North Macedonia
Expatriate footballers in Kazakhstan
Armenian expatriate sportspeople in Ukraine
Armenian expatriate sportspeople in Kazakhstan